Myrtille Gollin (born 8 July 1984) is a French short track speed skater. She competed in two events at the 2006 Winter Olympics.

References

External links
 

1984 births
Living people
French female short track speed skaters
Olympic short track speed skaters of France
Short track speed skaters at the 2006 Winter Olympics
People from Saint-Martin-d'Hères
Sportspeople from Isère
21st-century French women